Stanislav and variants may refer to:

People
Stanislav (given name), a Slavic given name with many spelling variations (Stanislaus, Stanislas, Stanisław, etc.)

Places
  Stanislav, a coastal village in Kherson, Ukraine
 Stanislaus County, California
 Stanislaus River, California
 Stanislaus National Forest, California
 Place Stanislas, a square in Nancy, France, World Heritage Site of UNESCO
 Saint-Stanislas, Mauricie, Quebec, a Canadian municipality
 Stanizlav, a fictional train depot in the game TimeSplitters: Future Perfect
 Stanislau, German name of Ivano-Frankivsk, Ukraine

Schools
 St. Stanislaus High School, an institution in Bandra, Mumbai, India
 St. Stanislaus High School (Detroit)
 Collège Stanislas de Paris, an institution in Paris, France
 California State University, Stanislaus, a public university in Turlock, CA
 St Stanislaus College (Bathurst), a secondary school in Bathurst, Australia
 St. Stanislaus College (Guyana), a secondary school in Georgetown, Guyana
Saint Stanislaus Catholic High School in Bay St. Louis, Mississippi

Other
 "Stanislaus", a 2009 song by Sea Wolf from White Water, White Bloom

See also
 Stanislov (Hasidic dynasty)
 Jesus Estanislao, Secretary of Finance of the Philippines, 1990-1992